Imamzadeh Hossein (Persian: امامزاده حسین) or Shahzadeh Hossein (Persian: شاهزاده حسین) is an imamzadeh in Kordan, Alborz province, Iran. The building dates back to Sejuk era and is the burial site of one of the descendants of the fourth Shia Imam, Zayn al-Abidin.

It was enlisted among the national heritage sites of Iran with the registration number 3828 on 15 May 2001.

References 

Tourist attractions in Alborz Province